Sam is a kind of vehicle, usually car, motorcycle or tractor made by yourself or in a workshop. It is made in a single copy, less often in a small series. It is created by a thorough alteration of a serial vehicle or by building it from scratch. A vehicle brand "SAM" under the Act   is a vehicle built using body, chassis or  frame, own design. The construction uses many components of serial vehicles. The name derives from the popular in the 1950s in Poland by the competition of the weekly  called Auto Amatorski Motoru, in which the editors of the magazine presented handcrafted constructions by workers or craftsmen .

"SAM" tractors are used in  agriculture and  horticulture, most often without approval and  registration - hence they are not allowed for  road traffic on  public roads.

Vehicle registration requires technical inspection .

The scope of tests allowing for admission to traffic is specified in the regulation by the  Minister of Infrastructure of October 22, 2004 (Journal of Laws No. 238, item 2395)  on tests of compliance of historic vehicles and "SAM" brand vehicles with technical conditions .

Reservations regarding registration:

 Self-built vehicle using Body, Chassis or frame of own design, brand of which is referred to as "SAM" without specifying model type
 Engine and you cannot build it yourself - documents for the complete engine assembly must be submitted for registration.

Footnotes

External Links 

 
 
 Examples of "SAM" vehicles:
 Car "SAM"
 Vehicle "SAM"

Vehicles
Agricultural machinery
Kit vehicles
Vehicles of Poland
:pl:Sam_(motoryzacja)